= Wilma Popper =

Hungarian writer (1857–1944)

- Born: Wilhelmina Popper; 11 May 1857; Raab, Kingdom of Hungary
- Died: 11 June 1944 (aged 87); Auschwitz, Nazi German-occupied Poland
- Writing career
- Language: German, Hungarian
- Genres: Children's literature, short stories

Wilhelmina Popper (11 May 1857 – 11 June 1944) was a Hungarian Jewish short story and children's writer.

Popper was born in Raab, Hungary to Josefine (née Leon) and Dr. Armin Popper. She was educated in her native town, and began to write at an early age. Besides contributing essays to various German and Hungarian periodicals, she published numerous volumes of stories and sketches.

She was murdered at the Auschwitz concentration camp in 1944.

== Bibliography ==
- Märchen und Geschichten für große und kleine Kinder. Leipzig: Wartig. 1891.
- Altmodische Leute. Novelletten und Skizzen. Dresden: Pierson. 1894.
- Miniaturen. Novelletten. Dresden: Pierson. 1896.
- Neue Märchen und Geschichten. Dresden: Pierson. 1898.
- Sonderlinge. Novelletten. Dresden: Pierson 1899.
- Nieten. Novellen. Dresden: Pierson. 1900.
- Die Fahne hoch! Ein Buch für Knaben. Dresden: E. Pierson. 1902.
- Gegen den Strom. Novellen. Dresden: Pierson. 1902.
- Fratres sumus. Novellen. Dresden: Pierson. 1903.
- Fünfe aus einer Hülse. Novellen. Vienna: Stern. 1904.
- Kleine Münze. Skizzen und Parabeln. Leipzig: Modernes Verlagsbureau. 1906.
- Wintersonne. Novellen. Leipzig: Modernes Verlagsbureau. 1907.
- Fromme Seelen. Novellen. Leipzig-Gohlis: Volger. 1909.
- Feierabend. Ein Buch für die Alten. Novellen. Vienna: Konegen. 1914.
- Fabeln und Parabeln. Dresden: Pierson. 1926.
